James Donald Armstrong (12 June 1899 – after 1932) was an English professional footballer who played in the Football League for Barnsley, Bournemouth & Boscombe Athletic and Accrington Stanley. He also played for Chester-le-Street and Stalybridge Celtic.

He is Accrington Stanley's Football League appearance record holder.

References

1899 births
Year of death missing
Sportspeople from Chester-le-Street
Footballers from County Durham
English footballers
Association football defenders
Barnsley F.C. players
AFC Bournemouth players
Accrington Stanley F.C. (1891) players
Stalybridge Celtic F.C. players
English Football League players